Lucas Kruspzky (born 6 April 1992) is an Argentine professional footballer who plays as a left-back for Patronato.

Club career
Kruspzky debuted in the first team of Independiente in a 1–2 defeat to Estudiantes de La Plata, for the 16th fixture of the 2010 Apertura.

In 2014, he signed for Atlético de Rafaela.

International career
Kruspzky was born in Argentina and is of Polish descent. Kruspzky was called for the Argentina U-17 national team in 2009, being part of the squad in the 2009 South American Under-17 Football Championship and the 2009 FIFA U-17 World Cup. He also played for the U-21 team the 2009 Toulon Tournament.

In 2011, he was selected by coach Walter Perazzo for the Argentina U-20 national team, to play in the 2011 FIFA U-20 World Cup.

Personal life
Kruspzky's younger brother, Facundo, is also a professional footballer.

References

External links
 
 Argentine Primera statistics at Fútbol XXI  
 Lucas Kruspzky at Soccerway

1992 births
Living people
Footballers from Buenos Aires
Association football fullbacks
Argentine footballers
Argentina youth international footballers
Argentine people of Polish descent
Footballers at the 2011 Pan American Games
Argentine Primera División players
Primera Nacional players
Club Atlético Independiente footballers
Arsenal de Sarandí footballers
San Martín de San Juan footballers
Atlético de Rafaela footballers
Talleres de Córdoba footballers
Aldosivi footballers
Club y Biblioteca Ramón Santamarina footballers
Pan American Games medalists in football
Pan American Games silver medalists for Argentina
Medalists at the 2011 Pan American Games